Lower Lawrencetown is a  rural residential community within Halifax Regional Municipality Nova Scotia on the Eastern Shore on Route 207 along the scenic route  Marine Drive .

References
Explore HRM

Communities in Halifax, Nova Scotia
General Service Areas in Nova Scotia